The 2015–16 season is Pegasus's 8th season in the top-tier division in Hong Kong football. Pegasus will compete in the Premier League, Senior Challenge Shield, FA Cup and League Cup in this season.

Key events
 27 May 2015: Hong Kong defender Deng Jinghuang announces his retirement from football.
 1 June 2015: Hong Kong midfielder Ju Yingzhi leaves the club and joins Eastern on a free transfer.
 2 June 2015: Hong Kong goalkeeper Tse Tak Him leaves the club and joins KC Southern for free.
 3 June 2015: Hong Kong defender Sham Kwok Fai leaves the club and joins KC Southern for free.
 4 June 2015: Hong Kong defender Tong Kin Man leaves the club and joins Kitchee on a free transfer.
 9 June 2015: Hong Kong striker Chan Man Fai leaves the club and joins South China on a free transfer.
 10 June 2015: Hong Kong So Wai Chuen announces his retirement from football.
 19 June 2015: Hong Kong goalkeeper Ho Kwok Chuen leaves the club and joins Eastern on a free transfer.
 23 June 2015: Nigerian defender Festus Baise leaves the club and joins Eastern on a free transfer.
 24 June 2015: Australian goalkeeper Jerrad Tyson leaves the club and joins Perth Glory on a free transfer.
 30 June 2015: Hong Kong midfielder Lee Hong Lim leaves the club and joins Eastern on a free transfer.
 3 July 2015: Hong Kong midfielder Ip Chung Long and striker Yip Tsz Chun leave the club and join Yuen Long on a free transfer.
 8 July 2015: The club announces their squad list for the season.
 15 July 2015: Hong Kong striker Sham Kwok Keung leaves the club and joins Kitchee on a free transfer.
 1 August 2015: Hong Kong defender Chan Kong Pan leaves the club and joins KC Southern on a free transfer.
 20 August 2015: Brazilian midfielder João Emir Porto Pereira joins the club on a free transfer.

Players

Squad information

Source: Pegasus FC
Ordered by squad number.
LPLocal player; FPForeign player; NRNon-registered player

Transfers

In

Summer

Out

Summer

Loan In

Summer

Loan Out

Summer

Club

Coaching staff

Squad statistics

Overall Stats
{|class="wikitable" style="text-align: center;"
|-
!width="100"|
!width="60"|League
!width="60"|Senior Shield
!width="60"|FA Cup
!width="60"|Total Stats
|-
|align=left|Games played    ||  0  ||  0  ||  0  || 0
|-
|align=left|Games won       ||  0  ||  0  ||  0  || 0
|-
|align=left|Games drawn     ||  0  ||  0  ||  0  || 0
|-
|align=left|Games lost      ||  0  ||  0  ||  0  || 0
|-
|align=left|Goals for       ||  0  ||  0  ||  0  || 0
|-
|align=left|Goals against   ||  0  ||  0  ||  0  || 0
|- =
|align=left|Players used    ||  0  ||  0  ||  0  || 0
|-
|align=left|Yellow cards    ||  0  ||  0  ||  0  || 0
|-
|align=left|Red cards       ||  0  ||  0  ||  0  || 0
|-

Appearances and goals
Key

No. = Squad number

Pos. = Playing position

Nat. = Nationality

Apps = Appearances

GK = Goalkeeper

DF = Defender

MF = Midfielder

FW = Forward

Numbers in parentheses denote appearances as substitute. Players with number struck through and marked  left the club during the playing season.

Top scorers

The list is sorted by shirt number when total goals are equal.

Disciplinary record
Includes all competitive matches.Players listed below made at least one appearance for Southern first squad during the season.

Substitution Record
Includes all competitive matches.

Last updated: 25 July 2015

Captains

Competitions

Overall

First Division League

Classification

Results summary

References

Hong Kong football clubs 2015–16 season
TSW Pegasus FC seasons